The 2017 season was the 112th season of competitive football in Norway.

The season began in March, and ended in December with the 2017 Norwegian Football Cup Final.

Men's football

Promotion and relegation

League season

Eliteserien

1. divisjon

2. divisjon

Group 1

Group 2

3. divisjon

Group 1

Group 2

Group 3

Group 4

Group 5

Group 6

4. divisjon

Cup competitions

Norwegian Cup

Final

Mesterfinalen

Match details

Women's football

Promotion and relegation
Teams promoted to Toppserien
 Grand Bodø

Teams relegated from Toppserien
 Urædd

League season

Toppserien

1. divisjon

Norwegian Women's Cup

Final
Avaldsnes 1–0 Vålerenga

UEFA competitions

UEFA Champions League

Qualifying phase

Second qualifying round

|}

Third qualifying round

|}

UEFA Europa League

Qualifying phase and play-off round

First qualifying round

|}

Second qualifying round

|}

Third qualifying round

|}

Play-off round

|}

Group stage

Group L

UEFA Women's Champions League

Qualifying round

Group 9

Knockout phase

Round of 32

|}

Round of 16

|}

National teams

Norway men's national football team

2018 FIFA World Cup qualification (UEFA)

Group C

Friendlies

Norway women's national football team
The following is a list of matches in 2017

Friendlies

2017 Algarve Cup

Group B

Eleventh place match

UEFA Women's Euro 2017

Group A

References

 
Seasons in Norwegian football